The second government of Isabel Díaz Ayuso was formed on 21 June 2021, following the latter's reelection as President of the Community of Madrid by the Assembly of Madrid on 18 June and her swearing-in on the next day, as a result of the People's Party (PP) emerging as the largest parliamentary force at the 2021 Madrilenian regional election.

The cabinet comprises members of the PP and a number of independents.

Investiture

Council of Government
The Council of Government is structured into the office for the president and nine ministries.

Departmental structure
Isabel Díaz Ayuso's second government was organised into several superior and governing units, whose number, powers and hierarchical structure varied depending on the ministerial department.

Unit/body rank
() Deputy minister
() Director-general

Notes

References

2021 establishments in the Community of Madrid
Cabinets established in 2021
Cabinets of the Community of Madrid